Thornton is a town in nestling on the banks of the Goulburn River in the state of Victoria, Australia. It is in the Shire of Murrindindi local government area. The town is approximately halfway between Alexandra and Eildon. The town had a population of 299 at the 2016 census.

History

The locality was named after a nearby pastoral run called Thornton Run that was established in 1840.

Thornton Post Office opened on 22 August 1914  and is still open and running from the local pub.

Services

The township has a Hotel and a caravan park in the centre of town. Petrol is available for purchase at the service station.

Sport

The Thornton-Eildon District Football & Netball Club play their home games on the Thornton recreation reserve. The club competes in the Outer East Football Netball League.

Tourism

To the south of Thornton is the Cathedral Ranges National Park where the visitor can participate in bushwalking or go rockclimbing.

References

Towns in Victoria (Australia)
Shire of Murrindindi